RKC may refer to:

 RKC Waalwijk, an association football team in the Netherlands
 Rajkumar College, Rajkot, a K-12 school in the city of Rajkot, India
 Rajkumar College, Raipur, a K-12 school in the city of Rajpur, India
 Montague Airport (California) in Montague, California, United States
 Kochi Broadcasting, a Japanese commercial broadcaster
 Roman Key Card Blackwood, a bridge bidding convention; see Blackwood convention